The Savoureuse is the principal river running through the Territoire de Belfort. Its source is in the Ballon d'Alsace at 1190m altitude. From here, it runs through the city of Belfort to the town of Sochaux where it joins the Allan, a tributary to the Doubs.

References

Rivers of Bourgogne-Franche-Comté
Rivers of France
Rivers of the Territoire de Belfort
Rivers of Doubs